Nacora is an unincorporated community in Dakota County, Nebraska, United States.

History
Nacora is derived from a Spanish word meaning "I am born." A post office opened in Nacora in 1892, closed in 1894, reopened in 1898, and closed permanently in 1943.

References

Unincorporated communities in Dakota County, Nebraska
Unincorporated communities in Nebraska